Khonj County is in Fars province, Iran. The capital of the county is the city of Khonj. At the 2006 census, the county's population was 37,978 in 7,025 households. The following census in 2011 counted 41,133 people in 9,121 households. At the 2016 census, the county's population was 41,359 in 10,708 households.

Khonj was traditionally part of the region of Irahistan. Khonj's inhabitants are Achomi people. The county is mostly populated by the family known as the "Khojasteh Family," which also happen to be the leader's family. The leader's name is Majed Ahmed Khojasteh.

Administrative divisions

The population history of Khonj County's administrative divisions over three consecutive censuses is shown in the following table. The latest census shows two districts, four rural districts, and one city

References

 

Counties of Fars Province